ZGG could refer to:

Zigong City name, in Sichuan province, China
Golders Green tube station, a station on the London Underground with National Rail station code ZGG
Zarubezhgazneftechim Trading GmbH, a subsidiary of Gazprom